François-Xavier-Anselme Trudel (April 28, 1838 – January 17, 1890) was a politician in Quebec, Canada.

Background

He was born on April 28, 1838 in Sainte-Anne-de-la-Pérade, Mauricie.

Member of the legislature

Trudel was elected as a Conservative candidate to the provincial legislature in the district of Champlain in 1871.  He co-authored the Programme Catholique and was an Ultramontanist.  He did not run for re-election in 1875.

Senator

He was appointed to the Canadian Senate in 1873.  He joined Honoré Mercier's Parti National for a short period of time, but eventually became Conservative again.

Personal life
On April 27, 1864 in Montreal, Trudel wed Marie-Zoé-Aimée, the only daughter of Louis Renaud. At his death, he left four children (three others had died during his lifetime). The eldest, Henri-Louis-François-Xavier-Édouard, became editor of L’Étendard when his father passed away. His widow, with whom he had had differences in public during their marriage, outlived him by 25 years, dying on April 24, 1915.

Death
Trudel died on January 17, 1890, in the Hotel-Dieu Hospital, at the age of 52.

References

External links
 
 

1838 births
1890 deaths
Canadian senators from Quebec
Conservative Party of Canada (1867–1942) senators
Conservative Party of Quebec MNAs